The Fithian House is a historic house located at 116 N. Gilbert St. in Danville, Vermilion County Illinois. The Italianate house was built in 1855 for William Fithian. Fithian was a physician and a politician who served in the Illinois House of Representatives and Illinois Senate. In addition, Fithian donated land for and was the namesake of Fithian, Illinois, a Vermilion County village located west of Danville. Abraham Lincoln was a close friend of Fithian's, and while visiting Danville during his 1858 senatorial campaign, he stayed in the house and gave a speech from its second-floor balcony.

The house is now part of the Vermilion County Museum, a history museum which exhibits both the house's period interior and displays on local history and historical figures in a separate building.

The house was added to the National Register of Historic Places on May 1, 1975.

References

External links
 Vermilion County Museum

Houses on the National Register of Historic Places in Illinois
Houses completed in 1855
Houses in Vermilion County, Illinois
Museums in Vermilion County, Illinois
Historic house museums in Illinois
Italianate architecture in Illinois
Buildings and structures in Danville, Illinois
National Register of Historic Places in Vermilion County, Illinois